"" (K. 316/300b) is a recitative and aria for soprano and orchestra that Wolfgang Amadeus Mozart wrote for Aloysia Weber. It is famous for including two occurrences of a G6, i.e. the G above high C, or 1568 Hz by modern concert pitch – according to the Guinness Book of Records, the highest musical note ever scored for the human voice. (However, an A6 is scored in Ignaz Umlauf's Das Irrlicht, also sung by Aloysia Weber.)

History 
Mozart completed this recitative and aria in Munich on 8 January 1779, as an insertion aria for the opera Alceste by Christoph Willibald Gluck. It was written specifically to showcase the superlative vocal skills of Mozart's future sister-in-law, Aloysia Weber, who was only 18 at the time.  However, sopranos who are able to cope with the aria's demands have been few and far between, and hence the aria is usually omitted from performances of Alceste.  It has been therefore redesignated a concert aria, to be presented in concerts by such rare singers as are able to deliver its fiendishly difficult coloratura.

Music 
The aria is scored for solo oboe, solo bassoon, 2 horns in C, and strings. The following aria is 192 bars long and in C major. The aria has a vocal range of two octaves and a major second (or 2500 cents), from F4 to G6; the latter note occurs only twice (in bars 165 and 172 of the aria):

Libretto
The text of the aria is from the opera Alceste, and was written by Ranieri de' Calzabigi. It is inserted at act 1, scene 2.

Popoli di Tessaglia,
ah mai più giusto fu il vostro pianto;
a voi non men che a questi
innocenti fanciulli Admeto è padre.
Io perdo il caro sposo, e voi l'amato re.
La nostra sola speranza, il nostro amor
c'invola questo fato crudel,
né so chi prima in sì grave sciagura
a compianger m'appigli
del regno, di me stessa, o de' miei figli.
La pietà degli dei sola
ci resta d'implorare, d'ottener.
Verrò compagna alle vostre preghiere,
a' vostri sacrifizi avanti all'are
una misera madre, due bambini infelici,
tutto un popolo in pianto presenterò così.
Forse con questo spettacolo funesto,
in cui dolente gli affetti,
i voti suoi dichiara un regno,
placato alfin sarà del ciel lo sdegno.
  
Io non chiedo, eterni dei
tutto il ciel per me sereno.
Ma il mio duol consoli almeno,
qualche raggio di pietà.
Non comprende mali miei
né il terror che m’empie il petto,
chi di moglie il vivo affetto,
chi di madre il cor non ha.
Peoples of Thessaly,
ah, your tears were never more just;
to you no less than to these
innocent children Admetus is a father.
I lose the dear husband, and you the beloved king.
Our only hope, our love
this cruel fate takes us away,
nor do I know who before in such a grave disaster
to feel sorry for me
of the kingdom, of myself, or of my children.
The mercy of the gods alone
it remains for us to beg, to obtain.
I will come as a companion to your prayers,
to your sacrifices before the are
a miserable mother, two unhappy children,
I will present a whole people in tears like this.
Perhaps with this fatal sight,
in which painful the affections,
his vows declare a kingdom,
at last, there will be indignation from heaven.
  
I don't ask, eternal gods
all the sky for me is clear.
But my grief consoles at least,
some ray of pity.
He does not understand my ills
nor the terror that fills my chest,
who of a wife the keen affection,
who does not have the heart of a mother.

References

External links 
 *
 
 , Ayako Tanaka

Arias by Wolfgang Amadeus Mozart
Opera excerpts
1779 compositions
Compositions in C minor
Compositions in C major
Soprano arias
Arias in Italian